Anne-Marie Duff (born 8 October 1970) is an English actress and narrator. 

After graduating from Drama Centre London, Duff made television appearances in Trial & Retribution, Amongst Women and Aristocrats in the late 1990s. She made her breakthrough as Fiona Gallagher on the Channel 4 drama series Shameless and as Queen Elizabeth I in The Virgin Queen; both earned her BAFTA nominations for Best Actress. She was awarded the BAFTA Cymru Award for Best Actress for her work in the 2007 television film The History of Mr Polly. Further television roles include Claire Church in From Darkness (2015), Ma Costa in the BBC and HBO series His Dark Materials (2019), Erin Wiley in Sex Education (2020–2021) and as Tracy Daszkiewicz in The Salisbury Poisonings (2020).

In film, Duff has had roles in Enigma (2001), The Magdalene Sisters (2002), Notes on a Scandal (2006), French Film (2008), The Last Station (2009) and Nowhere Boy (2009), alongside Shameless co-star David Threlfall; the latter earned her a nomination for the BAFTA Award for Best Actress in a Supporting Role. She later appeared in Before I Go to Sleep (2014) and Suffragette (2015).

Early life and education
Duff was born in London on 8 October 1970, the youngest of two children of Irish immigrants: her father, a painter and decorator at Fuller's Brewery in Chiswick, was from County Meath and her mother was from County Donegal and worked in a shoe shop. The family lived in Southall, London, and Duff attended Mellow Lane School. While at school, she joined the school choir, where she discovered she could 'really sing'. She paid for singing lessons with a woman who taught classical singing, who made a huge impact. Duff initially thought about pursuing a career as a singer and talked about it in great depth with her teacher, who looked at her and said, 'I think you have the soul of an actor.' At an early age, Duff attended a local youth theatre, Young Argosy, linked to the Argosy Players, in order to battle her shy nature; she soon became hooked on the stage. After further study of Film and Theatre, at the age of 19, she attended the Drama Centre in London, alongside John Simm, Anastasia Hille and her good friend Paul Bettany.

Career

Screen work
Duff made her first television appearance in ITV drama Trial & Retribution as Cathy Gillingham for two episodes in 1997. She later made appearances in series such as Amongst Women, in Aristocrats as Lady Louisa Lennox and in 2003 BBC television film Charles II: The Power and the Passion as Henrietta of England. She first came to the attention of the British public in 2002 for her work playing Margaret in The Magdalene Sisters. She also had a minor role in Holby City as Alison McCarthy. Duff played 
Holly in the first series of Simon Nye sitcom, Wild West, alongside Dawn French and Catherine Tate in 2002. In 2002, Duff appeared in her first major film role as Margaret McGuire in The Magdalene Sisters.

Duff's first critical acclaim came for her portrayal of Queen Elizabeth I in the lavish 2005 BBC television miniseries The Virgin Queen, which also starred Tom Hardy, Emilia Fox and Sienna Guillory. For Elizabeth I, she was nominated for the British Academy Television Award for Best Actress in both 2006 and 2007. 

Following her breakthrough, Duff ventured into films, first appearing in Notes on a Scandal, alongside Judi Dench. After film roles in Irish film Garage and The Waiting Room, she next appeared in a main role in comedy film French Film and Is Anybody There? in 2008. In 2009, Duff received further attention when she played the mother of John Lennon, Julia Stanley, a role for which she won British Independent Film Award for Best Supporting Actress in Nowhere Boy. She also appeared in The Last Station, a biopic about Leo Tolstoy’s later years, in which she played his devoted daughter Sasha. She appeared in less known film roles following this before her appearance in 2014 film Before I Go to Sleep. Throughout this time, Duff continued to appear on mainstream television in Parade's End, a five-part BBC/HBO/VRT television serial adapted from the tetralogy of eponymous novels (1924–1928) by Ford Madox Ford as Edith Duchemin and in BBC One crime drama From Darkness which premiered in October 2015, appearing in the starring role. Of Duff’s performance, Metro stated "Not a fan of police procedural dramas? Good, because this ain’t that.  From Darkness is a character-driven tale of one women’s journey and resolve and it includes a bloody brilliant performance by Duff."

In 2015, she played Violet Miller in the film Suffragette, a working-woman who introduces Maud Watts (Carey Mulligan) to the fight for women's rights in east London. "Violet is extraordinary, she's a firebrand - a tornado that comes into Maud's life and changes it forever. I found her thrilling," says Duff.

In 2016, Duff was cast in a new BBC animated miniseries of Watership Down, alongside her former husband James McAvoy. It premiered in December 2018; Duff appeared as Hyzenthlay. In 2019, Duff once again appeared with McAvoy in the BBC One and HBO adaption of Philip Pullman's His Dark Materials.

In 2020, Duff portrayed Erin Wiley, the estranged heroin addict mother of established character Maeve in the second season of critically acclaimed Netflix original series Sex Education. She later returned to the role for the third season. In June 2020, Duff appeared in a main role as Tracy Daszkiewicz in three-part drama The Salisbury Poisonings. The series portrays the 2018 Novichok poisoning crisis in Salisbury, England, and the subsequent Amesbury poisonings.

Duff narrated the BBC Two documentary Hospital in 2017. The series followed the National Health Service in unprecedented times.

Stage work
An accomplished theatre actor, she has worked extensively with the Royal National Theatre, including its 1996 production of Helen Edmundson's adaptation of Leo Tolstoy's War and Peace, and also in London's West End (Vassa, Collected Stories). Credits at the National Theatre include Collected Stories, King Lear and the title character in Marianne Elliott's production of George Bernard Shaw's Saint Joan to great acclaim. In 2011 she played Alma Rattenbury in Terence Rattigan's final play Cause Célèbre at The Old Vic, directed by Thea Sharrock.

Duff was nominated for a Laurence Olivier Award in 2000.

Personal life
Duff married Scottish actor James McAvoy in 2006, and gave birth to their son in 2010. On 13 May 2016, Duff and McAvoy announced they were divorcing. To minimise disruption to their son's life, they initially shared a home in North London when not working elsewhere.

She admits to being 'a hopeless romantic. And that means sometimes I'll burn with pain as well as burn with desire, I will. 'Cos that's the nature of opening your heart up to someone else ... This sounds ironic, of course, but sometimes in a marriage you are never closer than the moment at which the two of you decide it's time to finish.'

Duff's father called her by the nickname Smudge when she was growing up.

Activism
In 2007 she was one of nine female celebrities to take part in the What's it going to take? campaign promoting awareness of domestic abuse in the United Kingdom.

Filmography

Film

Television

Radio and audio

Theatre

Awards and nominations

References

External links
Duff at the British Film Institute

1970 births
Living people
Actresses from London
Alumni of the Drama Centre London
British people of Irish descent
English film actresses
English people of Irish descent
English radio actresses
British Shakespearean actresses
English stage actresses
English television actresses
People from Chiswick
20th-century English actresses
21st-century English actresses